Fethi Haddaoui (born December 9, 1961 in Tunis) is a Tunisian actor, director, writer and producer.

Biography 
Fethi Haddaoui is the main actor in several plays, including Arab and El Aouada, he is also a television personality thanks to his participation in several soap operas and series, as well in Tunisia as in Syria, in Jordan, in Morocco, in Turkey. in the United Arab Emirates, Lebanon, Italy and France. In the cinema, he plays in several European films under the direction of directors like Franco Rossi, Serge Moati, Jean Sagols Peter Kassovitz and others.

Haddaoui won numerous awards during his career, including Best Supporting Actor for his role in No Man's Love and Noce d'été at the Carthage Film Festival, best male interpretation at the  Oran International Arabic Film Festival , best director at the Festival des radios and Arab televisions for La Cité du savoir.

Filmography

Films

Short films 

 1992 : Un certain regard by Khaled Barsaoui
 1997 : Clé de sol by Chawki Mejri
 1998 : Kelibia Mazzara by Jean Franco Pannone and Tarek Ben Abdallah
 2011 : Sauve qui peut by Fethi Doghri
 2013 : N'importe quoi by Ismahane Lahmar 
 2013 : Peau de colle by Kaouther Ben Hania

Television
{{columns-list|colwidth=35em|
 1992 : Liyam Kif Errih by Slaheddine Essid
 1993 : Between the Lines  by J. C. Wilsher 
 1993 : La Tempête by Abdelkader Jerbi
 1994 : Ghada by Mohamed Hadj Slimane as Afif
 1995 : La Moisson by Abdelkader Jerbi
 1997 : Tej Min Chouk by Chawki Mejri as Saaïda
 1999 : Al Toubi by Basil Al-Khatib
 2002 : Holako by Basil Al-Khatib
 2002 : Gamret Sidi Mahrous by Slaheddine Essid as: Mahmoud Saber
 2003 : Al Hajjaj by Mohamed Azizia
 2004 : Abou Zid Al-Hilali by Basil Al-Khatib
 2005 : La Dernière rose by Fardous Attassi
 2005 : Al Murabitun Wa Al Andalus by Nagi Teameh
 2006 : Khalid ibn al-Walid by Mohamed Azizia as Malek Ibn Awf
 2008 : Sayd Errim  by Ali Mansour as Raîf
 2010 : Casting by Sami Fehri
 2010 : Al-Hassan wa Al-Hussain by Abdul Bari Abu El-Kheir
 2011 : L'Infiltré by Giacomo Battiato
 2012 : Pour les beaux yeux de Catherine by Hamadi Arafa
 2012 : Omar (2012) - as Abu Sufyan by Hatem Ali
 2013 : Yawmiyat Imraa by Mourad Ben Cheikh : Ali
 2013 : Layem by Khaled Barsaoui
 2013 : Zawja El Khamsa by Habib Mselmani
 2014–2015 : Naouret El Hawa by Madih Belaïd
 2015 : School (episode 1) by Rania Gabsi
 2015 : Bolice (episode 3 and 4) by Majdi Smiri
 2016 : Le Président by Jamil Najjar
 2017 : Lemnara by Atef Ben Hassine
 2017 : The Imam  by Abdul Bari Abu El-Kheir
 2019 : El Maestro by Lassaad Oueslati
 2019 : Kingdoms of Fire  by Peter Webber
 2019–2020 : Awled Moufida by Sami Fehri et Saoussen Jemni (seasons 4 and 5) as Boubaker Ouerghi
 2020 : Nouba (season 2) by Abdelhamid Bouchnak as Ridha Dandy
 2020 : Galb Edhib by Bassem Hamraoui
 2021 : Awled El Ghoul by Mourad Ben Cheikh as Mr Ismael El Ghoul
 2022 : Baraa by Mourad Ben Cheikh as Wannès
}}

 Theater 

 1982 : Doulab by Habib Chebil (Tunisia)
 1984 : Mawal by Habib Chebil (Tunisia)
 1987 : Arab by Fadhel Jaïbi and Fadhel Jaziri (Tunisia)
 1989 : El Aouada by Fadhel Jaïbi and Fadhel Jaziri (Tunisia)
 2000 : Il Corano by Arbi Chérif (Italy)
 2003 : Œdipe by Sotigui Kouyaté (France)
 2011 : Lecture croisée with Fanny Ardant (Tunisia)
 2012 : Lecture croisée with Carole Bouquet (Tunisia)
 2013 : Lecture (Tunisia)
 2014 : Lecture (France)
 2017 : Promesse Factory'' (France)

Videos 

 2014-2015: advertising spots for the Tunisian brand of harissa and tomato paste Sicam

Awards and nominations 

 1979 : Award for best male performance for her role in I swore the victory of the sun at the National Festival of School Theater, Ibn Charaf high school ;
 1980 : Award for the best male interpretation for his role in Nazeem Hikmet at the National Festival of School Theater Ibn Charaf high school ;
 2000 :
 Best Supporting Actor for his role in No Man's Love in Carthage Film Festival ;
 Best Male Interpretation at the Oran International Arabic Film Festival ;
 2004 : Best Supporting Actor for his role in Summer Wedding in Carthage Film Festival  ;
 2010 : Best Director at the Arab Radio and Television Festival for La Cité du savoir ;
 2013 :
 Best actor at the Oran International Arabic Film Festival ;
 Best actor and Ramadan star prize at the Romdhane Awards, awarded by Mosaïque FM ;
 2014 : Best actor at the Romdhane Awards for his role in Naouret El Hawa ;
 2019 :
 Best Actor at the Romdhane Awards ;
 Best popular Tunisian actor for his role in El Maestro by Sayidaty Magazine
 2020 :
 Best Actor at the Romdhane Awards  ;
 Best Tunisian actor by Tunivisions ;
 Best Popular Tunisian Actor by Sayidaty Magazine ;
 Best Maghreb Actor by ET bel Arabi ;

References

External links

Tunisian male film actors
People from Tunis
1961 births
Living people
21st-century Tunisian male actors